Seksan Chaothonglang (born 10 September 1983) is a former professional footballer from Thailand.

Match fixing scandal and ban
On February 21, 2017 Seksan was accused of match-fixing on several league games. He was arrested by royal thai police and banned from football for life.

External links
 thaipremierleague.co.th

References

1983 births
Living people
Seksan Chaothonglang
Seksan Chaothonglang
Association football defenders
Seksan Chaothonglang
Seksan Chaothonglang
Seksan Chaothonglang
Seksan Chaothonglang